The Singapore national futsal team is controlled by the Football Association of Singapore, the governing body for futsal in Singapore and represents the country in international futsal competitions, such as the World Cup and the AFC Futsal Championship.

Tournaments

FIFA Futsal World Cup
 1989 – Did not enter
 1992 – Did not enter
 1996 – Did not enter
 2000 – Did not qualify
 2004 – Did not enter
 2008 – Did not enter
 2012 – Did not enter
 2016 – Did not qualify
 2020 – To be determined

AFC Futsal Championship
 1999 – Round 1
 2000 – Round 1
 2001 – Round 1
 2002 – Did not enter
 2003 – Did not enter
 2004 – Did not enter
 2005 – Did not enter
 2006 – Did not enter
 2007 – Did not enter
 2008 – Did not enter
 2010 – Did not enter
 2012 – Did not enter
 2014 – Did not enter
 2016 – Did not qualify
 2018 – Did not enter

AFF Futsal Championship
 2001 –  Second Place
 2003–2014 – Did not participate
 2015 – Group Stage
 2016–2017 – Did not participate

Fixture and results

All-time team record vs opponents

References

External links
 Football Association of Singapore website

Singapore
Futsal
Futsal in Singapore